Nine Zero (نائن زیرو) was the name given to the headquarters of Pakistan's political party, Muttahida Qaumi Movement founded in 1984. It was located in Azizabad, a sub-division of Federal B. Area, Karachi.

The house was constructed on a 120 square yards (1080 sq ft.) plot, belonging to the family of the MQM founder, Altaf Hussain, as he lived in house #494/8, Block 8 in Azizabad, Karachi-75950 (near "Liaqut Ali Khan Chowk"). After some years and many political and social developments – Nine Zero gained a reputation of a famed and long-feared headquarters of the MQM political party.

It had now become the center of MQM's political and social activities. Altaf Hussain frequently delivered his speeches there by video or tele-conferencing in order to communicate with the workers of the political party. It was also the main centre of MQM political party in Karachi and was an important location for political meetings & discussions.

MQM Headquarter "Nine Zero" was named that way by the last two digits of its then phone number: 631-3690, not the plot or house number.

Controversies

On 11 March 2015, Pakistan Rangers carried out a raid at Nine Zero, the headquarters of MQM in Karachi as well as the party’s public secretariat Khursheed Begum Memorial Hall and arrested over 100 MQM activists.

At least 27 suspects were presented before an anti-terrorism court. Rangers claimed that they apprehended nearly half a dozen target killers – including Faisal Mehmood, aka 'Faisal Mota', who was sentenced to death in the murder case of Geo News journalist Wali Khan Babar in 2011 and a huge quantity of arms and ammunition, walkie talkies, binoculars and other military gear used by NATO forces in Afghanistan were also seized during the raid.

Nine Zero was sealed on 23 August 2016 by the Pakistan Rangers following a hate speech delivered by MQM's leader, Altaf Hussain. In this speech, he incited the party workers to attack Pakistani media houses, which resulted in street rioting and one death in Karachi. This 2015 Rangers raid turned out to be a turning point for MQM party or some people call it a beginning of the MQM's end as a political party. A section of political analysts believe that the situation had already started worsening against the MQM, when London's Metropolitan Police arrested and detained Altaf Hussain, the party founder, in 2014 for investigation which washed away the impression that he was untouchable and safe in Britain.

Later many leaders of MQM have been arrested by Pakistan Rangers for investigation. Since this 2015 raid, many surprising and sudden developments led to the splitting of the MQM into many factions. A group of former MQM people have formed a new party called Pak Sarzameen Party under the leadership of Syed Mustafa Kamal and Anis Kaimkhani.

For the first time in its 30-year history, MQM had a humiliating defeat in the 2018 Pakistani general election.

References

Organisations based in Karachi
Headquarters of political parties
Muttahida Qaumi Movement
Muttahida Qaumi Movement politicians
Muttahida Qaumi Movement – London